Toshihisa Toyoda is a Japanese economist, with contribution in Econometrics and Development Economics.

In general
Toshihisa Toyoda was born in Okayama Prefecture, Japan, on August 6, 1940. He attended Okayama Asahi High School, in Okayama City.

Toyoda received his bachelor's degree from the Economics Faculty of Kobe University in 1963, and his master's degree there in 1965. Then, in 1967-71, he attended the Graduate School of Industrial Administration (now called Tepper School of Business), Carnegie Mellon University, where he received his Ph.D in 1971. Omicron Delta Epsilon.

In 1966, he began working as a research associate in the Economics Faculty of Kobe University, later becoming a lecturer and then an associate professor of the same faculty. Finally, he became a professor in 1980.

From 1993 to 2003, Toyoda worked at Kobe University's Graduate School of International Cooperation Studies, and, from 2004 to 2012, at the Graduate School of Economic Sciences at Hiroshima Shudo University, Hiroshima City. He is now a Professor Emeritus at Kobe University and a Professor Emeritus at Hiroshima Shudo University.

His contribution in the international arena also included doing research and teaching at University of Essex (1988) and Beijing Normal University (2012). In addition, he, in 2010–2014, was a professor by special invitation at Global Innovation Research Center, Ritsumeikan University, Kyoto, which is noted for working closely with overseas, especially with the Asian countries.In 2005-08, he was the Japan Society of International Development (JASID) president. He particularly contributed to the colleges and universities of the Asian countries, for example, in the establishment of the Faculty of Economics and Business Administration, National University of Laos, Vientiane, Laos.

Econometrics and development economics
Toyoda's contribution has been in both Econometrics and Development economics. In addition, he published papers in such international journals as Econometrica, Journal Political Economy, International Economic Review, Journal of Econometrics, Empirical Economics, Asian Economic Journal, Journal of Economic Development, etc.

Publication
Toyoda has published books related to economics both in Japanese and English:

 Toshihisa Toyoda et al., "The Principles of Statistics" Third Edition, in Japanese (Toyo Keizai, 2010) 
 Toshihisa Toyoda, "Quantitative Analysis of Economy" in Japanese (Rokko Press, 2004) 
 Toyoda, T., and T. Inoue, (eds.), Quantitative Analysis on Contemporary Economic Issues, Kyushu University Press, 2008
 Toyoda, T., Nishikawa, J., and H. K. Sato, (eds.), Economic and Policy Lessons from Japan to Developing Countries, Palgrave Macmillan, 2011
 Kaneko, Y., Matsuoka, K., and T. Toyoda, (eds.), Asian Law in Disasters: Toward a human-centered recovery, Routledge, 2016
 Toyoda, T., Wang, J., and Y. Kaneko, (eds.), Build Back Better: Challenges of Asian Disaster Recovery, Springer, 2021

See also
Econometrics
Development economics

References

External links
 Kobe University
 Scholar Citation - Toshihisa Toyoda

Japanese economists
Carnegie Mellon University alumni
Development economists
1940 births
Living people